Tilmann is a given name. Notable people with the name include:

Tilmann Buddensieg (1928-2013), German art historian
Tilmann Wröbel (born 1964), Franco-German fashion designer

See also
Tillmann, given name and surname
Tilman, given name and surname